Gabrielle Poulin (June 21, 1929 - January 31, 2015) was a Canadian writer. One of the most prominent writers in Franco-Ontarian literature, she was most noted for her 1994 novel Le Livre de déraison, which won the Grand Prix du Salon du livre de Toronto in 1994.

Born and raised in Saint-Prosper, Quebec, she spent her adult life in Ottawa, Ontario with her husband, historian and academic René Dionne. She published 13 books throughout her career, including novels, short stories, poetry and non-fiction writing. In a 2000 review of a reissue of her early novel Un cri trop grand, Stefan Psenak praised her writing about women characters who were able to be both sensible and passionate.

She was a three-time Trillium Book Award nominee, receiving nods for La Couronne d'oubli in 1991, for Le Livre de déraison in 1995. and for Ombres et lueurs in 2004.

René Dionne et Gabrielle Poulin : œuvres et vies croisées, an anthology of critical essays about both Dionne's and Poulin's work, was published in December 2014 just a few weeks before Poulin's death.

Works

Fiction
Cogne la caboche (1979)
English translation All the Way Home by Jane Pentland, 1984
Un cri trop grand (1980)
Les Mensonges d'Isabelle (1983)
La Couronne d'oubli (1990)
Le Livre de déraison (1994)
Qu'est-ce qui passe ici si tard? (1997)

Poetry
Petites fugues pour une saison sèche (1991)
Nocturnes de l'oeil (1993)
Mon père aussi était horloger (1996)
Ombres et lueurs (2003)

Non-fiction
Les miroirs d'un poète (1969)
Romans du pays, 1968-1979 (1980)
La Vie, l'Écriture (2000)

References

1929 births
2015 deaths
20th-century Canadian non-fiction writers
20th-century Canadian novelists
20th-century Canadian poets
20th-century Canadian short story writers
20th-century Canadian women writers
21st-century Canadian non-fiction writers
21st-century Canadian novelists
21st-century Canadian poets
21st-century Canadian short story writers
21st-century Canadian women writers
Canadian women non-fiction writers
Canadian women novelists
Canadian women poets
Canadian women short story writers
Canadian non-fiction writers in French
Canadian novelists in French
Canadian poets in French
Canadian short story writers in French
French Quebecers
Franco-Ontarian people
People from Chaudière-Appalaches
Writers from Quebec
Writers from Ottawa